Jangan-gu, established on July 1, 1988, is the northern district of the city of Suwon in Gyeonggi-do, South Korea. It is approximately 15 km. from central Seoul.

Geography
Jangan-gu lies in the north of Suwon. It is bordered by Uiwang to the north-west, Yongin to the north and east, Yeongtong-gu to the south-east, Paldal-gu to the south and Gwonseon-gu to the south west.

Jangan-gu's northern border, with Yongin, is the mountain of Gwanggyosan.  At 582 metres above sea level, this is Suwon's highest point.

Most of the streams passing through Suwon originate in Jangan-gu, on Gwanggyosan or other nearby peaks. Since Suwon is bounded to the east by other hills, the streams, chiefly the Suwoncheon, flow southwards through the city, eventually emptying into the Yellow Sea at Asan Bay. The entirety of Suwon is drained in this manner.

Administrative divisions
The administrative "dong" (wards) of Jangan-gu are as follow.  These differ substantially from the postal "dong".

Jeongja-dong (Hangul: 정자동) (divided into Jeongja 1 to 3 Dong)
Jowon-dong (Hangul: 조원동) (divided into Jowon 1 and 2 Dong)
Pajang-dong (Hangul: 파장동) (divided into Pajang-dong and Imok-dong)
Songjuk-dong (Hangul: 송죽동)
Yeonghwa-dong (Hangul: 영화동)
Yeonmu-dong (Hangul: 연무동) (divided into Yeonmu-dong, Sanggwanggyo-dong and Hagwanggyo-dong)
Yulcheon-dong (Hangul: 율천동) (divided into Yuljeon-dong and Cheoncheon-dong)

Education

There are 25 municipal and 19 private kindergartens, 20 municipal primary schools, 13 municipal middle schools, 9 municipal and 3 private high schools, 1 college, namely Dongnam Health College and one university, namely Sungkyunkwan University's natural science campus, in Jangan-gu.

Recreation

Jangan-gu is home to Suwon Civil Stadium, a multi-purpose sports complex which hosted the handball events of the 1988 Summer Olympics.  The area also contains Manseok Park, a recreational area surrounding a small reservoir.

Food and drink
Jangan-gu has a wide range of restaurants serving food from a variety of countries.  With Korean food widespread across the district, there is also Vietnamese food available by North Suwon Homeplus, Datzzang Japanese donkas by Manseok Park, Chinese lamb skewers by Sungkyunkwan University, and Pizza Hut by Cheoncheon-dong's Lotte Mart.  Korean-style bars are in abundance throughout the area, while western-style bars can be found by Manseok Park and Sungkyunkwan University.

See also
Suwon
Gwonseon-gu
Paldal-gu
Yeongtong-gu
Suwon Sports Complex

References

External links
 Council of Suwon site

Districts of Suwon